Streat is a surname. Notable people with the surname include: 

 Raymond Streat (1897–1979), British cotton industry administrator
 Thelma Johnson Streat (1911–1959), African-American artist, dancer, and educator

See also
 Street (surname)